Tomasz Laskowski (born 17 December 1984) is a Polish footballer who plays as a goalkeeper for Polish team Warta Międzychód.

External links
 
 

1984 births
Living people
Górnik Zabrze players
GKS Katowice players
Świt Nowy Dwór Mazowiecki players
Kmita Zabierzów players
Raków Częstochowa players
Miedź Legnica players
Bytovia Bytów players
Warta Poznań players
I liga players
II liga players
IV liga players
Polish footballers
Association football goalkeepers
Sportspeople from Ruda Śląska